Flava was a British hip-hop music television channel owned and operated by Sony Pictures Television.

It was launched in June 2004 and was formerly called B4 TV, a previous pre-launch music channel from CSC Media Group. Flava broadcast for 24 hours a day and played Hip Hop, Urban and R&B music from the late 1970s to the 2010s. It also occasionally showed films and original programming (#PLAY). The channel advertised itself as 100% Old Skool Hip-Hop/R&B 24/7.

History

B4
Flava launched on 12 July 2004 and started off as a test channel which focused on Pop and Dance under the name of "B4". The channel used to play the latest pre release music videos from the notable artists and groups. It also had hours dedicated to playing requested music. The channel had advertised itself as both 'B4 It's A Hit' and 'B4 Everyone Else'.

The B4 logo was on screen in the bottom left-hand corner during music videos and the song information was shown in a white coloured bar at the start and near the end of each music video. The channels' identity was also seen before and after advert breaks when the B4 logo forms on screen in a white box shape on an orange background.

B4 was available 24 hours a day on Sky channel 357 and was part of several music channels owned by CSC Media Group.

B4 also produced an early morning music video programme broadcast from 2004 on weekdays on Channel 4 at 7am. It was normally broadcast as part of Channel 4's breakfast programming following children's programmes and preceding a number of comedy programmes from America. Produced by the firm behind ITV's The Chart Show, the show featured around seven new upfront videos each day that were going to be released in the United Kingdom in the near future, normally within the next month.

Rebrand to Flava
The B4 rebrand to Flava first came to light when the Ofcom licence for B4 was removed and replaced by one under the name of Flava, this also reflected the EPG references of the term "Flava" being used to describe the programmes being shown, in late February/early March 2008. On 26 March 2008, B4 launched officially as an all-urban music channel named Flava.

On 29 September 2009, Flava launched on Freesat channel 502, replacing Scuzz on the platform.

On 26 November 2012, Flava changed its logo. On 5 June 2013, Flava swapped positions with Scuzz on Sky. The channel moved from channel 367 to 374, while Scuzz moved from 374 to 367 (to sit next to Kerrang!, as both are rock music channels).

On 21 July 2014, Flava, along with Bliss were removed from Freesat.

On 23 April 2017, Flava introduced a brand new logo, changed their programme graphics from blue to black (red in some programmes and yellow in "Remember The Year"), as well as later rebranding themselves to be a 100% Old Skool Hip Hop and RnB channel on 2 May 2017.

Closure

Flava ceased broadcasting at 11:15 on 1 November 2017 without warning, with "Juicy" by The Notorious B.I.G. the final music video to be played on the channel. Flava abruptly crashed and went blank in the middle of the video. The channel was then closed down and removed from the EPG abruptly and shortly after. The last video played in full was "In Da Club" by 50 Cent.

Programming

99 Problems: Rap Anthems - We've got 99 rap anthems for you right now, so keep it Flava for Old Skool Eminem, Jay Z, Dr Dre, Snoop, 2Pac & more.
A-Z of Hip Hop - The ultimate countdown of the best Hip-Hop videos from artists A-Z.
Bass Believers - A collection of the best drum 'n' base tunes.
Big Tunes Fo' Shizzle - Non stop variety of Hip Hop Music
Block Rockin Beatz - A mix of big urban tunes.
Brand New! This Weeks Hottest - Brand new music, and the biggest new hip-hop and R&B music.
Breakfast Beats - Non-stop hip hop, rnb & drum 'n' bass music.
Britain's Next Urban Superstar with Jordan Kensington - The nationwide talent search ran by Jordan Kensington.
Charlie Sloth's Old Skool Takeover - BBC Radio 1Xtra presenter Charlie Sloth chooses his selection of old skool hip hop music.
Dope Morning Beats - The latest urban music on a morning.
Double Up - Back to back videos from the best urban artists around.
Drum 'n' Bass - A mix of the finest drum 'n' base music.
First for Flava - A collection of the newest urban music videos.
Flava at the Flicks - The best hip-hop music from movies
Freshest Beats - The latest urban music.
Garage Anthems - The best in new and classic garage tunes.
Godfathers of Hip Hop - The best music from male urban artists.
Hip Hop Download Chart - A countdown of the weeks most downloaded Hip-Hop tracks.
Hip Hop Number Ones - A collection of Hip-Hop number ones from recent years.
Hip Hop Vs Garage - A mash up of Hip-Hop and garage music.
Hip Hop Xplosion - A mix of the biggest Hip-Hop music.
In The Mix - The biggest urban, hip-hop, pop and R&B tunes, in the mix!
In The Mix: 90s Hip-Hop Anthems - Rap classics from the 90s, in the mix.
Masters of Hip Hop - Music from the founders of Hip-Hop.
Morning Rewind - Hip Hop from the 80s, 90s & 00s on a morning.
Non Stop Flava - Non-stop R&B and Hip-Hop music.
Official Flava Urban Chart - Get your daily fix of the hottest RnB, Hip Hop, grime and dance tracks in our massive Top 20 countdown.
Party Flava - Classic urban party tunes.
#PLAY - Interactive twitter block
#PLAY: Eminem and Friends - A special edition of #PLAY reserved for songs by Eminem and his collaborators.
#PLAY: Movie Soundtracks - A special edition of #PLAY featuring hip-hop music from movies.
R&B Download Chart - A countdown of the most downloaded R&B songs each week.
R&B Singles Chart - Countdown of the weeks' top R&B music.
Scratch Masters - Back to back scratch tunes from the experts.
Something for da Honeyz - The best music from male RnB/Hip-Hop artists.
Straight Outta Old Skool - Hip Hop from the 80s, 90s & 00s
The Jump Off - A collection of Hip-Hop music with the loudest beats.
Top 10 Biggest Tracks Now - The latest top 10 hottest urban tunes.
Top 20 Bad Boyz of Hip Hop - Countdown of the best male artists in Hip-Hop.
Top 20 Buff Boys - We unleash 20 of the buffest boys in hip hop music!
Turn Up The Flava - A collection of the best R&B music from the last two years.
Urban Beats - The best new and classic R&B and Hip-Hop music.
Urban Cutz - The latest R&B and Hip-Hop music.
Wake Up wit Flava - A mix of the latest new music.
Westwood TV - Interviews with artists from the hip hop scene
xXx: State of the Union - See more.

B4 programming
B4 Breakers - A countdown of the top ten most selected videos.
B4 Breakfast - An energetic mix of the latest pre-release songs.
B4 Dawn - Music from new artists and groups.
B4 Hits - A selection of the newest music.
B4 Loves... - An hour dedicated to the life and music of one artist or group.
B4's Big Ones - A mix of the biggest and best hits.
B4's Hot Hits - All the latest and most requested music videos.
B4's Lovin'  - The most requested new music.
B4's Most Selected - The top ten most requested music videos.
Brand New - All the biggest and newest music videos.
First on Friday - All the latest music videos every Friday.
Fresh New Tracks - A showcase of brand new music videos.
Most Requested - Songs most requested by the viewers.
Out Tomorrow - Brand new music that's released tomorrow.
Today's Most Selected - An hour of music videos selected by viewers.
Top 5 - Five non interrupted songs from an artist or group.
Top Ten Bands to See This Week - A countdown of the top ten best bands to see in concert.
Videos to Cure a Hangover - A mix of the best non-stop music.
Wake Up with B4 - A selection of fresh new music videos.

External links
Flava - Official site
CSC Media Group
Official myspace

CSC Media Group
Music video networks in the United Kingdom
Television channels and stations established in 2004
Sony Pictures Television
Television channels and stations disestablished in 2017
Defunct television channels in the United Kingdom